The Palacio de Bellas Artes (Palace of Fine Arts) is a prominent cultural center in Mexico City. It has hosted notable events in music, dance, theatre, opera and literature in Mexico and has held important exhibitions of painting, sculpture and photography. Consequently, the Palacio de Bellas Artes has been called the "Cathedral of Art in Mexico". The building is located on the western side of the historic center of Mexico City next to the Alameda Central park.

The first National Theater of Mexico was built in the late 19th century, but it was soon decided to tear this down in favor of a more opulent building in time for Centennial of the Mexican War of Independence in 1910. The initial design and construction was undertaken by Italian architect Adamo Boari in 1904, but complications arising from the soft subsoil and the political problem both before and during the Mexican Revolution, hindered then stopped construction completely by 1913. Construction began again in 1932 under Mexican architect  and was completed in 1934. It was then inaugurated on November 29, 1934 and was the first art museum in Mexico dedicated to exhibiting artistic objects for contemplation.

The exterior of the building is primarily Art Nouveau and Neoclassical and the interior is primarily Art Deco. The building is best known for its murals by Diego Rivera, Siqueiros and others, as well as the many exhibitions and theatrical performances it hosts, including the Ballet Folklórico de México.

History

The oldest known structure on the site was the Convent of Santa Isabel, whose church was built in 1680. However, significant Mexica finds, such as a sacrificial altar in the shape of a plumed snake have been found here. The convent area suffered frequent drought during the early canal period and development here grew quickly. 

In spite of this, the convent remained until it was forcibly closed in the 1860s by the Reform Laws. It was replaced by a textile mill and lower-class housing.

A section of this housing, on Santa Isabel Alley, was torn down and replaced by the National Theater in the latter 19th century. During the late 19th century and very early 20th, this theatre was the site of most of Mexico City's high culture, presenting events such as theatre, operettas, Viennese dance and more.

It was then decided to replace this building with a more opulent one for the upcoming Centennial of Mexican Independence celebrations in 1910. The old theatre was demolished in 1901, and the new theatre would be called the Gran Teatro de Ópera. The work was awarded to Italian architect Adamo Boari, who favored neoclassical and art nouveau styles and who is responsible for the Palacio del Correo which is across the street. Adamo Boari promised in October 1904 to build a grand metallic structure, which at that time only existed in the United States, but not to this size. The first stone of the building was placed by Porfirio Díaz in 1904. Despite the 1910 deadline, by 1913, the building was hardly begun with only a basic shell. One reason for this is that the project became more complicated than anticipated as the heavy building sank into the soft spongy subsoil. The other reason was the political and economic instability that would lead to the Mexican Revolution. Full hostilities suspended construction of the palace completely and Adamo Boari returned to Italy.

The project would sit unfinished for about twenty years. In 1932, construction resumed under Mexican architect . Mariscal completed the interior but updated it from Boari's plans to the more modern Art Deco style. The building was completely finished in 1934, and was inaugurated on 29 November of that year. The inaugural work presented in the theatre was "La Verdad Sospechosa" by Juan Ruiz de Alarcón in 1934. In 1946, the Instituto Nacional de Bellas Artes (National Institute of the Fine Arts) was created as a government agency to promote the arts and was initially housed at the Museo Nacional de Artes Plásticas, the Museo del Libro and other places. It is now at the Palacio.

In this theatre, Maria Callas debuted in the opera Norma in 1950.

In 2002, the palace was the scene of the funeral of María Félix.

Since its initial construction, very little has been updated or modified. However, intensive renovation efforts were begun in 2009 for the upcoming 2010 celebrations. Much of the equipment and machinery is original from the early 20th century. Much of the technological equipment is being updated, especially in the theatre which needs computerized lights, sound systems and other improvements. Other work will improve the acoustics. Upgrades to the theatre will allow for multimedia shows which were not available before. The main hall has had no renovation or upgrade work since it opened in 1934. Renovations here will lessen the number of people the hall can accommodate but should make the area more comfortable.

The building

The palace has a mixture of a number of architectural styles; however, it is principally Art Nouveau and Art Deco. Art Nouveau dominates the exterior, which was done by Adamo Boari, and the inside is dominated by Art Deco, which was completed by Federico Mariscal. Since construction began in 1904, the theater (which opened in 1934) has sunk some four meters into the soft soil of Mexico City. The main facade, which faces Avenida Juárez, is made of white Italian Carrara marble. In the interior of the portal are sculptures by Italian Leonardo Bistolfi. It consists of "Harmony", surrounded by "Pain", "Rage", "Happiness", "Peace" and "Love". Another portion of the facade contains cherubs and sculptures representing music and inspiration. On the plaza front of the building, designed by Boari, there are four Pegasus sculptures which were made by Spanish Agustí Querol Subirats. These had been in the Zocalo before being brought here. The roof covering the center of the building is made of crystal designed by Hungarian Géza Maróti and depicts the muses with Apollo. One aspect of the Palace which has since disappeared is the "Pergola", which was located in the Alameda. It was constructed to house pictorial exhibitions for the 1910 celebrations, but it was demolished in 1973.

The interior is also surfaced in Carrara marble. It divides into three sections: the main hall with adjoining smaller exhibition halls, the theatre and the offices of the Insituto Nacional de Bellas Artes. The main hall is covered by the Marotti glass and iron roof. It and the balconies of all three upper floors can be seen from the ground floor below. In areas of the main hall, pre-Hispanic motifs done in Art Deco style, such as serpents’ heads on window arches and Maya Chaac masks on the vertical light panels distinguish this interior from its contemporaries. The smaller exhibition halls are located on the first and second floors. The first floor is decorated with crystal lamps, created by Edgar Brandt and hold murals by Rufino Tamayo. The Adamo Boari and Manuel M. Ponce halls hold music and literature events. And the National and International halls are for exhibitions. The second floor has smaller exhibition halls as well as murals by José Clemente Orozco, David Alfaro Siqueiros, Diego Rivera, Jorge González Camarena, Roberto Montenegro and Manuel Rodríguez Lozano. The third floor is occupied by the Museum of Architecture. The ironwork was designed in Italy by Alessandro Mazzucotelli and in Mexico by Luis Romero Soto.

At the entrance of the theatre, there are mascarons in bronze with depictions of Tlaloc, and Chaac, the Aztec and Maya deities of water, which along with the rest were designed by Gianette Fiorenzo. On the arch over the stage there are representations of various mythological personas such as the Muses with Apollo. This was constructed in Hungary in the workshops of Géza Maróti. However, the most impacting aspect is the stage "curtain" which is a stained glass foldable panel created out of nearly a million pieces of iridescent colored glass by Tiffany's in New York. This stage curtain is the only one of its type in any opera house in the world and weighs 24 tons. The design of the curtain has the volcanos Popocatépetl and Iztaccíhuatl in the center. Around them is a Mexican landscape surrounded by images of sculptures from Yautepec and Oaxaca. This design was inspired by work done by artist Gerardo Murillo (Dr. Atl). The theatre has a capacity of 1,000.

Events

The Palace has been the scene of some of the most notable events in music, dance, theatre, opera and literature and has hosted important exhibitions of painting, sculpture and photography. It has hosted some of the biggest names from both Mexico and abroad. It has hosted poetry events as well as those related to popular culture. Artists and companies are from all parts of Mexico and abroad. It has been called the "Cathedral of Art in Mexico" and is considered to be the most important theatre and the most important cultural center in Mexico. It was declared an artistic monument in 1987 by UNESCO. The building is administered by the Instituto Nacional de Bellas Artes of the federal government. The palace receive on average 10,000 visitors each week.

Two of the best-known groups which regularly perform here are the Ballet Folklórico de México Compania Nacional de Opera de Bellas Artes and the National Symphonic Orchestra. The first performs in the theatre twice a week and is a spectacle of pre and post Hispanic dance of Mexico. A typical program includes Aztec ritual dances, agricultural dances from Jalisco, a fiesta in Veracruz, a wedding celebration — all accompanies by mariachis, marimba players and singers. Regular annual events include the Premio Quorum for Mexican designers in graphic and industrial materials and the Premios Ariel for Mexican films.

Numerous individual events have been held here. These include several exhibitions of Frida Kahlo's work, and a number of appearances by Luciano Pavarotti. In 1987, Bellas Artes hosted a legendary performance of Jesusa Rodríguez's Donna Giovanni, an adaptation of Mozart's opera with a female cast. Other appearances have been made by Mexican baritone Jorge Lagunes (2002) and Catalan guitarist Joan Manuel Serrat (2003). Events that have been held here include "ABCDF Palabras de Ciudad" (2002) showing life in popular housing in photographs and video, "Bordados del Mexico Antiguo" (Embroidery of Old Mexico) showing processes, history and design, Rem Koolhaas Premio Pritzker 2000" conference and "Exchanging Views: Visions of Latin America" which was an exhibit from the collection of Patricia Phelps de Cisneros comprising 148 works by 72 artists from across Latin America in 2006.

Occasionally, the plaza in front of the Palace is the scene of protests such as those against the Iraq War in 2003 and against bullfighting in 2010.

Murals

The floors between the ground floor and the uppermost floor are dominated by a number of murals painted by most of the famous names of Mexican muralism.

On the 2nd floor are two early-1950s works by Rufino Tamayo: México de Hoy (Mexico Today) and Nacimiento de la Nacionalidad (Birth of Nationality), a symbolic depiction of the creation of the mestizo (person of mixed indigenous and Spanish ancestry) identity.

At the west end of the 3rd floor is El hombre controlador del universo (Man, controller of the universe- known as Man at the Crossroads), originally commissioned for New York's Rockefeller Center in 1933. The mural depicts a variety of technological and societal themes (such as the discoveries made possible by microscopes and telescopes) and was controversial for its inclusion of Lenin and a Soviet May Day parade. The Rockefellers were not happy with the painting and the incomplete work was eventually destroyed and painted over. Rivera recreated it here in 1934. On the north side of the third floor are David Alfaro Siqueiros' three-part La Nueva Democracia (New Democracy) and Rivera's four-part Carnaval de la Vida Mexicana (Carnival of Mexican Life); to the east is José Clemente Orozco's La Katharsis (Catharsis), depicting the conflict between humankind's 'social' and 'natural' aspects.

Museo del Palacio de Bellas Artes

The Museo del Palacio de Bellas Artes (Museum of the Palacio de Bellas Artes) is the organization that takes care of the permanent murals and other artwork in the building as well as arrange temporary exhibits. These exhibits cover a wide range of media and feature Mexican and international artists, focusing on classic and contemporary artists.

Museo Nacional de Arquitectura
The Museo Nacional de Arquitectura (Museum of Architecture) occupies the top floor of the building, covered by the glass and iron roof. It contains exhibitions from renowned Mexican architects including models, designs and photographs of major works. The museum also arranges temporary exhibitions of its collections in other facilities to expose the Mexican public to the country's rich architectural heritage. Some of the major architects featured at the museum include Jaime Ortiz Monasterio, Carlos Mijares Bracho, Adamo Boari and Luis Barragán. The museum is divided into four sections called "Arquitectura-contrastes: Jaime Ortiz Monasterio y Carlos Mijares Bracho", "Corpus Urbanístico de la Ciudad de México", "Teatro Nacional de México (Plano original)" and "Teatro Nacional de México." There are also temporary exhibits on contemporary architecture.

Gallery

See also
List of Colonial government and civil buildings in Mexico City
List of colonial churches in Mexico City
List of archaeological sites in Mexico City
Lincoln Center

References

Further reading

External links

Palacio de Bellas Artes website  at palacio.bellasartes.gob.mx/

Buildings and structures in Mexico City
Opera houses in Mexico
Art museums and galleries in Mexico
Museums in Mexico City
Theatres in Mexico City
Cuauhtémoc, Mexico City
Historic center of Mexico City
Landmarks in Mexico City
National Monuments of Mexico
1934 establishments in Mexico
Theatres completed in 1934
Music venues completed in 1934
20th century in Mexico City
Neoclassical architecture in Mexico
Art Deco architecture in Mexico
Art Nouveau architecture in Mexico City
Art Nouveau theatres